Longone al Segrino is a small village and  between Como and Lecco in the province of Como in Lombardy, Italy. It is known for its lake, an unusual case of an intact ecosystem.

The municipality of Longone al Segrino contains the frazione (subdivision) Morchiuso.

Longone al Segrino borders the following municipalities: Canzo, Erba, Eupilio, and Proserpio.

Demographic evolution

References

Cities and towns in Lombardy